Dulha Bikta Hai is a 1982 Hindi drama film directed by Anwar Pasha starring Raj Babbar, Anita Raj and Neelam.

Cast 
 Raj Babbar
 Anita Raj
 Neelam
 Simple Kapadia
 Madan Puri
 Iftekhar
 Jagdish Raj
 Urmila Bhatt

Soundtrack
"Kahan Jate Ho Ruk Jaao Tumhe Meri Kasam" - Meena Patki, Anwar
"Dulha Bikta Hai" - Kishore Kumar
"Kahan Jaate Ho Ruk Jao" (Female) - Meena Patki
"Natija Achchha Niklega, Aa Jaa Mere Yaar Kare Hum Dono Aanke Char" - Anwar, Chandrani Mukherjee, Preeti Sagar
"Pyar Ki Hai Yeh Ada Yaara Tum Dar Gaye" - Meena Patki, Bappi Lahiri
"Adao Se Hamari Na Bach Paoge" - Dilip Sharma, Sulakshana Pandit, Anwar

References

External links
 

Films scored by Bappi Lahiri
1982 films
1980s Hindi-language films
Indian drama films